Utsira or its historical spelling Udsire may refer to:

Places
Utsira, a municipality in Rogaland county, Norway
Utsira (island), an island in Rogaland county, Norway
Utsira Church, a church in Utsira municipality, Rogaland county, Norway
Utsira Lighthouse, a lighthouse on the island of Utsira in Rogaland county, Norway
Utsira (Svalbard), an islet in the Svalbard archipelago in northern Norway

Other
HNoMS Utsira (S301), a submarine in the Royal Norwegian Navy
Rutebåten Utsira, a ferry company in Rogaland county, Norway